The Boy Who Turned Yellow (1972) is the last film collaboration by the British filmmakers Michael Powell and Emeric Pressburger, and the last theatrical film directed by Michael Powell. The film was made for the Children's Film Foundation.

Plot
John (Mark Dightam) loses one of his pet mice, Alice, whilst on a school trip to the Tower of London. Upset back in class, he is sent home by his teacher for not paying attention during a lesson on electricity. Later that day on the London Underground, the train and everyone in it suddenly turns bright, vivid yellow. John's doctor (Esmond Knight) declares that the condition is harmless and should wear off soon, but that evening John hears noises from his television set and meets the eccentric yellow-coloured Nick (short for Electronic) (Robert Eddison). The pair return to the Tower of London in an attempt to find Alice, but they are menaced by Yeoman Warders and John is threatened with execution. When John is finally reunited with his pet, he awakes in class. Was his adventure actually all just a dream?

Cast

Mark Dightam as John Saunders
Robert Eddison as Nick
Helen Weir as Mrs. Saunders
Brian Worth as Mr. Saunders
Esmond Knight as Doctor Ward
Laurence Carter as Schoolteacher
Patrick McAlinney as Supreme Beefeater
Lem Dobbs as Munro
Nigel Rathbone as Schoolboy
Peter Schofield as Beefeater

Production
The film was the last collaboration by Michael Powell and Emeric Pressburger. They also brought in some of their old colleagues from The Archers, such as cinematographer Christopher Challis and actor Esmond Knight.

Location shooting took place at sites around London:
Tower of London, Whitechapel
Holborn tube station, Aldwych branch platform (as Chalk Farm tube station and Hampstead stations)
Hampstead tube station, Hampstead (exterior only)
Christchurch Hill, Hampstead
Hampstead Heath, Hampstead
Willow Road, Hampstead

Awards
The film won a "Chiffy" award from the Children's Film Foundation. The "Chiffy" award was voted for by CFF audiences.

Notes

External links
 
 
 . Full synopsis and film stills (and clips viewable from UK libraries).
 Reviews and articles at the Powell & Pressburger Pages

1972 films
British children's films
Children's Film Foundation
Films directed by Michael Powell
Films by Powell and Pressburger
Films set in London
1970s children's films
1970s English-language films
1970s British films